"Mr. E's Beautiful Blues" is a song by the American rock band Eels. It was the first single to be released from their 2000 album, Daisies of the Galaxy.

Background and production 

It was produced and co-written by Michael Simpson of the Dust Brothers. Mark Oliver Everett wrote the song after finishing writing the album, and the record company insisted he put it on the album as well. He was against this idea, considering it a disruption of the album's flow, but made the compromise by putting it in as a bonus track.

Release 

The single reached No. 11 on the UK Singles Chart.

Legacy 

The song features prominently in the 2000 film Road Trip, and is used in part in the 2008 film Charlie Bartlett. In his autobiography, Everett states that letting the song be used for Road Trip is one of the few real regrets he has ever had. He only agreed to it because the record company threatened to not release the album if he did not go along with the recording of the video clip, and at this point the album had been on hold for over 7 months. He hated shooting the video, and as of 2008, he had never actually seen the movie.

Track listings

CD 1
 "Mr. E's Beautiful Blues" – 3:58
 "Birdgirl on a Cell Phone" – 3:05
 "Last Stop: This Town" (video)

CD 2
 "Mr. E's Beautiful Blues" – 3:58
 "Hospital Food" (Live from the BBC) – 3:24
 "Cancer for the Cure" (video)

7"
Side A: "Mr. E's Beautiful Blues" – 3:58
Side B: "Birdgirl on a Cell Phone" – 3:05

References

External links 
 

Eels (band) songs
2000 singles
Songs written by Mark Oliver Everett
Song recordings produced by Mark Oliver Everett
1999 songs
Music videos directed by Marcos Siega